is a train station on the Kyoto Municipal Subway Karasuma Line in Sakyo-ku, Kyoto, Japan.

Layout
The station locates underneath Kitayama dori street, all station structures except stairs are underground. The station has two floors, the upper one is the station office and ticket gates and lower one is an island platform with two tracks. The station has two stairs to access outside, the first stairs are on East side and the second is in West. East one is with escalators while West is with a lift. West one is with bicycle parking lots.

Tracks 

Destination of platforms are in accordance with the Kyoto city website

Around the station 
The station locates underneath Kitayama dori. Sugakuin Station of Eizan Electric Railway locates 800 m east from Matsugasaki Station. Myō/Hō (妙・法), the characters meaning "wondrous dharma" (referring to Buddhist teachings) of Gozan no Okuribi are held at the north of the station on 16 August every year.。

It is recorded that farmers having paddy ground started living in Matsugasaki in late 8th century and the name of Matsugasaki are found in the Yugiri waley, Evening Mistof The Tale of Genji. Even though the area flourished for over one thousand years, population of the area had remained the same between 9th and 19th centuries because strict local rule existed.
The original route of Eizan Electric Railway planned in 1922 was from Kitaoji to Nikendyaya via Matsugasaki, the route was changed before actual construction was commenced. From the end of Taisho era, Matsugasaki area has utilized as residential area and the movement is accelerated the opening of Kitayama dori street in 1985 and construction of subway Karasuma line.。

Bus stops 
Matsugasaki Station bus stop (adjacent to exit 1)
 Kyoto City Bus
 Route 4: To Kamigamo Shrine / Kyoto Station
 Route North 8(北8): To Senbon Kitaoji / Kitaoji Bus Terminal
 Kyoto Bus
 No number: To Takano Depot / Iwakura Muramatsu

Matsugasaki Kaijiri Cho bus stop 
 Kyoto City Bus
 Route 65: To Shijo Karasuma / Iwakura Depot
 Route North 8(北8): To Senbon Kitaoji / Kitaoji Bus Terminal
 Kyoto Bus
 Rounte 56: To Demachiyanagi station
 No number: To Takano Depot / Iwakura Muramatsu

References

Bibliography 
 
 

Railway stations in Japan opened in 1997
Railway stations in Kyoto Prefecture